Yantarny may also refer to Yantarni Volcano.

Yantarny (masculine), Yantarnaya (feminine), or Yantarnoye (neuter) is the name of several inhabited localities in Russia.

Modern localities
Urban localities
Yantarny, Kaliningrad Oblast, an urban-type settlement in Kaliningrad Oblast

Rural localities
Yantarny, Krasnodar Krai, a settlement in Michurinsky Rural Okrug of Dinskoy District in Krasnodar Krai; 
Yantarny, Rostov Oblast, a settlement in Bolshelogskoye Rural Settlement of Aksaysky District in Rostov Oblast; 
Yantarny, Saratov Oblast, a settlement in Pugachyovsky District of Saratov Oblast
Yantarnoye, Republic of Crimea, a selo in Krasnogvardeysky District of the Republic of Crimea
Yantarnoye, Kabardino-Balkar Republic (or Yantarnoye), a selo in Prokhladnensky District of the Kabardino-Balkar Republic; 
Yantarnoye, Orenburg Oblast, a selo in Baklanovsky Selsoviet of Sorochinsky District in Orenburg Oblast

Notes